Plaza de Toros Monumental de Valencia is a bull ring in Valencia, Venezuela.  It is used for bull fighting and other events like concerts and fairs. It is the second largest bullring in the world, the first being the Plaza de toros México. The stadium holds 24,708 people and was built in 1968.

References 

Buildings and structures completed in 1968
Monumental de Valencia
Buildings and structures in Carabobo